Zabel Asadour better known by her literary pseudonym Sibil was born as Zabel Khanjian, July 23, 1863 in Üsküdar district, İstanbul - June 19, 1934), was a famous Ottoman Armenian poet, writer, publisher, educator and philanthropist.

Biography 
She was educated at the Üsküdar  in Constantinople where she graduated in 1879. She taught in the provinces and then in Constantinople.

In 1879, she wrote the textbook Practical Grammar for Contemporary Modern Armenian (Գործնական քերականութիւն արդի աշխարհաբարի), a classical grammar book that has been revised and republished many times with help of her husband . Sibil also wrote general articles about education and pedagogy, as well as poems for children.

Writer and political figure Krikor Zohrab, Hrant Asadour, together with Sibil collectively re-established the literary publication Massis, where Sibil wrote portraits of many renowned Western Armenian literary figures. The articles were collected in 1921 in a joint book which Hrant Asadour entitled Profiles (Դիմաստուերներ).

Sibil was best known for her literary works. In the 1880s she published her poems in Massis and Hairenik. In 1891, she published her novel The Heart of a Girl (Աղջկան մը սիրտը) and a collection of poems, Reflections (Ցոլքեր), in 1902, mostly romantic and patriotic poems. She also wrote short stories, particularly about women. She also wrote for theater and one of her most famous works is the play The Bride (Հարսը). In 1901, she married writer, journalist, and intellectual Hrant Asadour. She and Hrant Asadour exchanged numerous love letters over the course of their courtship, a handful of which have been translated into English by Jennifer Manoukian.

References

External links

Zabel Sibil Asadour's play the Bride. Translated into English by Nishan Parlakian.
On Her Life and Work (In Armenian)
The Heritage of Armenian Literature: Volume III

1863 births
1934 deaths
19th-century Armenian poets
19th-century Armenian women writers
19th-century writers from the Ottoman Empire
20th-century Armenian poets
20th-century Armenian women writers
20th-century writers from the Ottoman Empire
Armenian philanthropists
Armenian feminists
Armenian-language women poets
Armenian-language poets
Women poets from the Ottoman Empire
Armenian educators
Educators from the Ottoman Empire
People from Üsküdar
Writers from Istanbul
Armenians from the Ottoman Empire
Burials at Şişli Armenian Cemetery